Schiavonetti may refer to:

Elisabetta Pilotti-Schiavonetti (1680–1742), Italian opera tic soprano 
 Lewis, or Luigi Schiavonetti (1765–1810), Italian reproductive engraver and etcher
Niccolo Schiavonetti (1771–1813), partner and brother of Luigi who took over his business when he died